RBI most often refers to:
Reserve Bank of India
Run batted in

RBI may also refer to:

Organisations 
Radio Berlin International
Raiffeisen Bank International
Reed Business Information
Restaurant Brands International
Ruđer Bošković Institute

Other
Reactive business intelligence
Relative bearing indicator
Reviving Baseball in Inner Cities
Risk based inspection
Rubidium iodide

See also 
R.B.I. Baseball (baseball video game series)